WASP-88 is a F-type main-sequence star. Its surface temperature is 6450 K. WASP-88 is similar to the Sun in its concentration of heavy elements, with a metallicity Fe/H index of 0.03, and is younger at an age of 3.0 billion years.

A multiplicity survey did detect a candidate red dwarf companion to WASP-88 in 2020, with a 1.65% probability of it being an unrelated background star.

Planetary system
In 2013, one planet, named WASP-88b, was discovered on a tight, circular orbit. The planet is highly inflated, and may be an easy target for atmospheric characterization. Planetary equilibrium temperature is 1775 K. The planetary atmosphere transmission spectrum is gray and featureless, probably indicating a large concentration of hazes.

References

Indus (constellation)
Planetary transit variables
F-type main-sequence stars
Planetary systems with one confirmed planet
J20380268-4827434